Alexandru Cotoi (often simply Alex Cotoi) is a Romanian composer, producer and disc jockey signed by Global Records. Over the years, he has worked with several high-profile singers including Delia, Irina Rimes, Inna and Alexandra Stan. Under the pseudonym Sickotoy, he released the commercially successful songs "Addicted" and "You Don't Love Me" in 2019 with Minelli and Roxen, respectively, which reached the top three on the Romanian Airplay 100 chart.

Early life and career
Cotoi wrote his first songs in 2003. In October 2007, he formed the music group Sonichouse with Radu Dumitriu, Răzvan Gorcinski, and Victor Bourosu, having met while being part of and performing alongside Morandi. During his time as a member of Sonichouse, Cotoi adopted the nickname of Kotto. Sonichouse released their only album, titled Supersonic, on 16 April 2011. The group stopped releasing music once Bourosu chose to pursue a solo career.

In 2022, he was a jury member on One True Singer, a music competition that was produced by HBO Max in collaboration with Global Records.

Personal life
Cotoi married his girlfriend in July 2018. The couple has a daughter.

Discography

Albums

Singles

Songwriting credits

References

External links
Sickotoy releases on Discogs

Global Records artists
Romanian composers
Romanian record producers
Living people
Year of birth missing (living people)